Gabe Bell (born 3 July 1995) is an Australian cricketer. He made his first-class debut for Tasmania in the 2016–17 Sheffield Shield season on 16 March 2017. He made his List A debut for Tasmania in the 2018–19 JLT One-Day Cup on 6 October 2018.

References

External links
 

1995 births
Living people
Australian cricketers
Cricketers from Launceston, Tasmania
Tasmania cricketers